USA-225, also known as the Rapid Pathfinder Prototype (RPP) and NRO Launch 66 (NROL-66), is an American satellite which was launched in 2011. The satellite is being used to perform technology demonstration and development experiments, including advanced dosimeters to characterize the space environment from a 1,200 kilometer low Earth orbit. It is operated by the United States National Reconnaissance Office.

Rapid Pathfinder was developed for less than US$20 million over a period of less than two years. Its dimensions are 0.5 m times 0.5 m times 0.5 m, and its mass including payload is 235 kg.

A Minotaur I carrier rocket was used to launch USA-225, flying from Space Launch Complex 8 of the Vandenberg Air Force Base. The launch of was originally scheduled for March 2011; however, it was subsequently moved forwards to 5 February.  During the attempt to launch on 5 February 2011, a transmitter malfunctioned, and the launch attempt was scrubbed. Another attempt was scheduled for the next day. At 12:26 on 6 February 2011, the Minotaur lifted off, carrying USA-225 into orbit. The launch was conducted by Orbital Sciences Corporation.

For launch, the RPP satellite was given the designation NRO Launch 66, or NROL-66. Upon reaching orbit it was named USA-225 in accordance with the usual naming system for American military spacecraft. The satellite received the International Designator 2011-006A, and the Satellite Catalog Number 37364.

See also

STEX

References

Spacecraft launched in 2011
Spacecraft launched by Minotaur rockets
USA satellites